São José do Rio Pardo is a municipality in the state of São Paulo in Brazil. The population is 55,124 (2020 est.) in an area of 419 km2. The elevation is 676 m. It was founded by Colonel Antônio Marçal Nogueira de Barros in 1870. In the same year, a chapel to Saint Joseph was built. It became a municipality in 1885, when it was separated from Casa Branca. In the late 1800s and the early 1900s the town received a mass of immigration from  northern Italy, those immigrants went to town for working in the coffee fields in replacement of the slave workforce, since slaves were set free in 1888 by an act of Princess Elizabeth.

References

External links 
 

Municipalities in São Paulo (state)
Populated places established in 1870
1870 establishments in Brazil